Nicolai Klapkarek (born 16 July 1965) is a German swimmer. He competed in four events at the 1984 Summer Olympics for West Germany.

References

1965 births
Living people
German male swimmers
Olympic swimmers of West Germany
Swimmers at the 1984 Summer Olympics
Sportspeople from Bochum
20th-century German people
21st-century German people